Shephard Edwin Mayer (September 11, 1923 – February 7, 2005) was a Canadian ice hockey player who played two games in the National Hockey League with the Toronto Maple Leafs during the 1942–43 season. The rest of his career, which lasted from 1942 to 1951, was spent in various minor leagues. Mayer was born in Sturgeon Falls, Ontario.

Career statistics

Regular season and playoffs

External links
 

1923 births
2005 deaths
Canadian ice hockey right wingers
Guelph Biltmore Mad Hatters players
Ice hockey people from Ontario
People from West Nipissing
Toronto Maple Leafs players
Valleyfield Braves players